Arnold Ilagan Atienza (born September 29, 1972), also known as Ali Atienza, is a politician, athlete, and newscaster in the Philippines. He was the Presidential Adviser on Youth Affairs from 2005 to 2007 and was concurrently the head of the Manila sports development office and inner city development program from 2001 to 2007. He is the youngest of two sons of former Manila Mayor Lito Atienza, the other being weatherman Kim Atienza.

Atienza first gained fame as a gold medalist for the Philippines taekwondo national team in the 1990s. On March 28, 2007, he formally filed his papers as candidate for Mayor of the City of Manila during the May 14, 2007, mid-term elections. In that election, Sen. Alfredo Lim won the 2007 mayoralty race, and had conceded to Lim.

On February 28, 2021, the Philippine Taekwondo Association conferred upon Atienza with a 5th Dan Blackbelt along with DICT Secretary Gregorio Honasan.

Personal profile
Atienza graduated from De La Salle University with the degree BS in Physics, with specialization in Computer Applications, (1989–1994), and earned from the Pamantasan ng Lungsod ng Maynila his master’s degree in Government Management. He was the lone gold medalist in the 1994 Asian Taekwondo Championships at the age of 21.

In 2001, he became the youngest chairman of the Manila Sports Council (MASCO) which hosted the Manila Youth Games, the MY National Invitational and Manila Marathons. He also became the Chairman of Manila inner city development and Manila employment committee where he was able to light the streets of Manila, employed thousands and was able to provide children from elementary public schools rice subsidy. He is a former anchor of IBC Express Balita from 2004 to 2007.

In 2007, he ran for mayor of Manila but lost to a veteran mayor, Alfredo Lim. On November 30, 2010, he was inaugurated as a barangay captain of a barangay in San Andres, Manila after winning the barangay elections.

In 2013, he became the topnotching councilor in the fifth district of Manila garnering almost 80,000 votes. He is considered a voice of the people with his stand on two major issues. First, with his fight against the Manila Bay reclamation and second for his firm stand against the 300% tax increase that the city council has approved.

In 2016, Atienza ran for Vice Mayor as the running mate of congressman Amado Bagatsing and later of former Mayor Alfredo Lim. However, he lost the race to Honey Lacuna.

Ali graduated in 2016 from National University of Singapore under the School of public policy in their Senior Management Programme. Atienza ran for congressman of the fifth district of Manila in 2019 but lost to incumbent Cristal Bagatsing.

He was appointed on December 4, 2020, as Undersecretary for Government Digital Broadcast Television and the Digitization of the Entertainment Industry Sector in Department of Information and Communications Technology.

References

http://www.inquirer.net/philippine-election-2013/articles/529869

External links
The City of Manila
The Philippine Daily Inquirer
The Manila Times

1972 births
Living people
People from San Andres, Manila
People from Manila
Sportspeople from Manila
Manila City Council members
Metro Manila city and municipal councilors
Filipino male taekwondo practitioners
Pamantasan ng Lungsod ng Maynila alumni
IBC News and Public Affairs people
Arnold
De La Salle University alumni
Asian Taekwondo Championships medalists